The South Pole, also known as the Geographic South Pole, Terrestrial South Pole or 90th Parallel South, is the southernmost point on Earth and lies antipodally on the opposite side of Earth from the North Pole, at a distance of 12,430 miles (20,004 km) in all directions. It is one of the two points where Earth's axis of rotation intersects its surface.

Situated on the continent of Antarctica, it is the site of the United States Amundsen–Scott South Pole Station, which was established in 1956 and has been permanently staffed since that year. The Geographic South Pole is distinct from the South Magnetic Pole, the position of which is defined based on Earth's magnetic field. The South Pole is at the centre of the Southern Hemisphere.

Geography 

For most purposes, the Geographic South Pole is defined as the southern point of the two points where Earth's axis of rotation intersects its surface (the other being the Geographic North Pole). However, Earth's axis of rotation is actually subject to very small "wobbles" (polar motion), so this definition is not adequate for very precise work.

The geographic coordinates of the South Pole are usually given simply as 90°S, since its longitude is geometrically undefined and irrelevant. When a longitude is desired, it may be given as  At the South Pole, all directions face north. For this reason, directions at the Pole are given relative to "grid north", which points northward along the prime meridian. Along tight latitude circles, clockwise is east, and anti-clockwise is west, opposite to the North Pole.

The Geographic South Pole is presently located on the continent of Antarctica, although this has not been the case for all of Earth's history because of continental drift.

Therefore, the position of the station and other artificial features relative to the geographic pole gradually shift over time.

The Geographic South Pole is marked by a stake in the ice alongside a small sign; these are repositioned each year in a ceremony on New Year's Day to compensate for the movement of the ice. The sign records the respective dates that Roald Amundsen and Robert F. Scott reached the Pole, followed by a short quotation from each man, and gives the elevation as "9,301 FT.". A new marker stake is designed and fabricated each year by staff at the site.

Ceremonial South Pole
The Ceremonial South Pole is an area set aside for photo opportunities at the South Pole Station. It is located some meters from the Geographic South Pole, and consists of a metallic sphere on a short barber pole, surrounded by the flags of the original Antarctic Treaty signatory states.

Historic monuments

Amundsen's Tent
The tent was erected by the Norwegian expedition led by Roald Amundsen on its arrival on 14 December 1911. It is currently buried beneath the snow and ice in the vicinity of the Pole. It has been designated a Historic Site or Monument (HSM 80), following a proposal by Norway to the Antarctic Treaty Consultative Meeting. The precise location of the tent is unknown, but based on calculations of the rate of movement of the ice and the accumulation of snow, it is believed, as of 2010, to lie between 1.8 and 2.5 km (1.1 and 1.5 miles) from the Pole at a depth of 17 m (56 ft) below the present surface.

Argentine Flagpole
A flagpole erected at the South Geographical Pole in December 1965 by the First Argentine Overland Polar Expedition has been designated a Historic Site or Monument (HSM 1) following a proposal by Argentina to the Antarctic Treaty Consultative Meeting.

Exploration

Pre-1900
In 1820, several expeditions claimed to have been the first to have sighted Antarctica, with the first being the Russian expedition led by Fabian Gottlieb von Bellingshausen and Mikhail Lazarev. The first landing was probably just over a year later when American captain John Davis, a sealer, set foot on the ice.

The basic geography of the Antarctic coastline was not understood until the mid-to-late 19th century. American naval officer Charles Wilkes claimed (correctly) that Antarctica was a new continent, basing the claim on his exploration in 1839–40, while James Clark Ross, in his expedition of 1839–1843, hoped that he might be able to sail all the way to the South Pole. (He was unsuccessful.)

1900–1950

British explorer Robert Falcon Scott on the Discovery Expedition of 1901–1904 was the first to attempt to find a route from the Antarctic coastline to the South Pole. Scott, accompanied by Ernest Shackleton and Edward Wilson, set out with the aim of travelling as far south as possible, and on 31 December 1902, reached 82°16′ S. Shackleton later returned to Antarctica as leader of the British Antarctic Expedition (Nimrod Expedition) in a bid to reach the Pole. On 9 January 1909, with three companions, he reached 88°23' S –  from the Pole – before being forced to turn back.

The first men to reach the Geographic South Pole were the Norwegian Roald Amundsen and his party on 14 December 1911. Amundsen named his camp Polheim and the entire plateau surrounding the Pole King Haakon VII Vidde in honour of King Haakon VII of Norway. Robert Falcon Scott returned to Antarctica with his second expedition, the Terra Nova Expedition, initially unaware of Amundsen's secretive expedition. Scott and four other men reached the South Pole on 17 January 1912, thirty-four days after Amundsen. On the return trip, Scott and his four companions all died of starvation and extreme cold.

In 1914 Ernest Shackleton's Imperial Trans-Antarctic Expedition set out with the goal of crossing Antarctica via the South Pole, but his ship, the Endurance, was frozen in pack ice and sank 11 months later. The overland journey was never made.

US Admiral Richard Evelyn Byrd, with the assistance of his first pilot Bernt Balchen, became the first person to fly over the South Pole on 29 November 1929.

1950–present

It was not until 31 October 1956 that humans once again set foot at the South Pole, when a party led by Admiral George J. Dufek of the US Navy landed there in an R4D-5L Skytrain (C-47 Skytrain) aircraft. The US Amundsen–Scott South Pole Station was established by air over 1956–1957 for the International Geophysical Year and has been continuously staffed since then by research and support personnel.

After Amundsen and Scott, the next people to reach the South Pole overland (albeit with some air support) were Edmund Hillary (4 January 1958) and Vivian Fuchs (19 January 1958) and their respective parties, during the Commonwealth Trans-Antarctic Expedition. There have been many subsequent expeditions to arrive at the South Pole by surface transportation, including those by Havola, Crary and Fiennes. The first group of women to reach the pole were Pam Young, Jean Pearson, Lois Jones, Eileen McSaveney, Kay Lindsay and Terry Tickhill in 1969. In 1978–79 Michele Eileen Raney became the first woman to winter at the South Pole.

Subsequent to the establishment, in 1987, of the logistic support base at Patriot Hills Base Camp, the South Pole became more accessible to non-government expeditions.

On 30 December 1989, Arved Fuchs and Reinhold Messner were the first to traverse Antarctica via the South Pole without animal or motorized help, using only skis and the help of wind. Two women, Victoria E. Murden and Shirley Metz, reached the pole by land on 17 January 1989.

The fastest unsupported journey to the Geographic South Pole from the ocean is 24 days and one hour from Hercules Inlet and was set in 2011 by Norwegian adventurer Christian Eide, who beat the previous solo record set in 2009 by American Todd Carmichael of 39 days and seven hours, and the previous group record also set in 2009 of 33 days and 23 hours.

The fastest solo, unsupported and unassisted trek to the south pole by a female was performed by Hannah McKeand from the UK in 2006. She made the journey in 39 days 9 hours 33 minutes. She started on 19 November 2006 and finished on 28 December 2006.

In the 2011–12 summer, separate expeditions by Norwegian Aleksander Gamme and Australians James Castrission and Justin Jones jointly claimed the first unsupported trek without dogs or kites from the Antarctic coast to the South Pole and back. The two expeditions started from Hercules Inlet a day apart, with Gamme starting first, but completing according to plan the last few kilometres together. As Gamme traveled alone he thus simultaneously became the first to complete the task solo.

On 28 December 2018, Captain Lou Rudd became the first Briton to cross the Antarctic unassisted via the south pole, and the second person to make the journey in 56 days. On 10 January 2020, Mollie Hughes became the youngest person to ski to the pole, aged 29.

Climate and day and night

During winter (May through August), the South Pole receives no sunlight at all, and is completely dark apart from moonlight. In summer (November through February), the sun is continuously above the horizon and appears to move in a counter-clockwise circle. However, it is always low in the sky, reaching a maximum of 23.5° around the December solstice because of the 23.5° tilt of the earth's axis. Much of the sunlight that does reach the surface is reflected by the white snow. This lack of warmth from the sun, combined with the high altitude (about ), means that the South Pole has one of the coldest climates on Earth (though it is not quite the coldest; that record goes to the region in the vicinity of the Vostok Station, also in Antarctica, which lies at a higher elevation).

The South Pole is at an altitude of  but feels like . Centrifugal force from the spin of the planet pulls the atmosphere toward the equator. The South Pole is colder than the North Pole primarily because of the elevation difference and for being in the middle of a continent. The North Pole is a few feet from sea level in the middle of an ocean.

As the six-month "day" wears on and the sun gets lower, temperatures drop as well: they reach  around sunset (late March) and sunrise (late September). Mean annual temperature at the South Pole is –49.5 °C (–57.1 °F).

The South Pole has an ice cap climate (Köppen climate classification EF). It resembles a desert, receiving very little precipitation. Air humidity is near zero. However, high winds can cause the blowing of snowfall, and the accumulation of snow amounts to about 7 cm (2.8 in) per year. The former dome seen in pictures of the Amundsen–Scott station is partially buried due to snow storms, and the entrance to the dome had to be regularly bulldozed to uncover it. More recent buildings are raised on stilts so that the snow does not build up against their sides.

Time
In most places on Earth, local time is determined by longitude, such that the time of day is more-or-less synchronised to the perceived position of the Sun in the sky (for example, at midday the Sun is roughly perceived to be at its highest). This line of reasoning fails at the South Pole, where the Sun is seen to rise and set only once per year with solar elevation varying only with day of the year, not time of day. Because there are more than 24 time zones in the world and they all meet up at the South Pole, it can be any hour, any minute, any second at the South Pole. There is no a priori reason for placing the South Pole in any particular time zone, but as a matter of practical convenience the Amundsen–Scott South Pole Station keeps New Zealand Time (UTC+12/UTC+13). This is because the US flies its resupply missions ("Operation Deep Freeze") out of McMurdo Station, which is supplied from Christchurch, New Zealand.

Flora and fauna
Due to its exceptionally harsh climate, there are no native resident plants or animals at the South Pole. Off-course south polar skuas and snow petrels are occasionally seen there.

In 2000 it was reported that microbes had been detected living in the South Pole ice. Scientists published in the journal Gondwana Research that evidence had been found of dinosaurs with feathers to protect the animals from the extreme cold. The fossils had been found over 100 years ago in Koonwarra, Australia, but in sediment which had accumulated under a lake which had been near to the South Pole millions of years ago.

See also

 List of Antarctic expeditions
 South Pole Telescope

References

External links

 NOAA South Pole Webcam
 360° Panoramas of the South Pole 
 Images of this location are available at the Degree Confluence Project
 South Pole Photo Gallery
 Poles by the Australian Antarctic Division
 The Antarctic Sun – Online news source for the U.S. Antarctic Program
 Big Dead Place 
 UK team makes polar trek history – BBC News article on first expedition to Pole of Inaccessibility without mechanical assistance
 Listen to Ernest Shackleton describing his 1908 South Pole Expedition, and read more about the recording on [australianscreen online].
 The recording describing Shackleton's 1908 South Pole Expedition was added to the National Film and Sound Archive's Sounds of Australia registry in 2007

 
East Antarctica
Extreme points of Earth
Geography of Antarctica
Polar regions of the Earth
Historic Sites and Monuments of Antarctica